Laurent Sempéré (born 9 July 1985) is a French rugby union coach and former player, he is currently the co-head coach of Stade Français in the Top 14 with Julien Arias. His position was Hooker. He began his career with USA Perpignan before moving to Racing Métro 92 in 2006. He then moved across Paris to Stade Français in 2008.

References

1985 births
Living people
French rugby union players
French rugby union coaches
USA Perpignan players
Sportspeople from Perpignan
Stade Français players
Rugby union hookers
Stade Français coaches
Racing 92 players
20th-century French people
21st-century French people